f is the eighth studio album by Japanese artist Masaharu Fukuyama. It was released on 25 April 2001.

Track listing

Heaven
Venus

Escape
Hey! (New Century Mix)
Gang
Dogi-magi
Blues
Carnival

Charts and sales

Oricon sales charts (Japan)

References

2001 albums
Masaharu Fukuyama albums